Aishihik  may refer to:

 Aishihik, village of the Southern Tutchone people at the north end of Äshèyi Män (Aishihik Lake) in Yukon
 Aishihik Lake, lake in southwestern Yukon, Canada
 Aishihik River, river in Yukon, Canada
 Aishihik First Nation, First Nation band government in Yukon, Canada